In algebraic number theory, a Gauss sum or Gaussian sum is a particular kind of finite sum of roots of unity, typically

Gauss sums are the analogues for finite fields of the Gamma function.

Such sums are ubiquitous in number theory. They occur, for example, in the functional equations of Dirichlet -functions, where for a Dirichlet character  the equation relating  and ) (where  is the complex conjugate of ) involves a factor

History 

The case originally considered by Carl Friedrich Gauss was the quadratic Gauss sum, for  the field of residues modulo a prime number , and  the Legendre symbol.

An alternate form for this Gauss sum is:

Quadratic Gauss sums are closely connected with the theory of theta functions.

The general theory of Gauss sums was developed in the early 19th century, with the use of Jacobi sums and their prime decomposition in cyclotomic fields. Gauss sums over a residue ring of integers  are linear combinations of closely related sums called Gaussian periods.

The absolute value of Gauss sums is usually found as an application of Plancherel's theorem on finite groups. The determination of the exact value of general Gauss sums, following the result of Gauss on the quadratic case, is a long-standing issue. For some cases see Kummer sum.

Properties of Gauss sums of Dirichlet characters
The Gauss sum of a Dirichlet character modulo  is

If  is also primitive, then

in particular, it is nonzero.

where  is the Möbius function.

Specifically,

Further properties
Gauss sums can be used to prove quadratic reciprocity, cubic reciprocity and quartic reciprocity
Gauss sums can be used to calculate the number of solutions of polynomial equations over finite fields, and thus can be used to calculate certain zeta functions

See also

 Quadratic Gauss sum
 Elliptic Gauss sum
 Jacobi sum
 Kummer sum
 Kloosterman sum
 Gaussian period
 Hasse–Davenport relation
 Chowla–Mordell theorem
 Stickelberger's theorem

References

Section 3.4 of 

Cyclotomic fields